Stratavarious is an album by Ginger Baker, released by Polydor in 1972. Baker had many associations with an eclectic mix of musicians brought together under numerous band titles bearing his surname. Stratavarious is the only album that was released under the name of Ginger Baker without other associated names. The lineup on Stratavarious included Bobby Tench, vocalist and guitarist from The Jeff Beck Group, who plays guitar under the pseudonym Bobby Gass and the Nigerian  pioneer of Afrobeat, Fela Kuti who appeared at concerts with Baker at this time.

The album was re-issued in 1998 on Polygram in the US under the title of Do What You Like, along with all of Ginger Baker's Air Force and Ginger Baker's Air Force 2.

Track listing

Personnel
 Ginger Baker - Drums, percussion, spoken word (6), effects (6)
 Fela Kuti - Organ (1 & 2), vocals (1 & 2), piano (3 & 4), choir (4)
 Bobby Tench - Bass (1-4), guitar (3 & 4), vocals (3 & 4)
 Alhaji JK Brimar - Percussion (1 & 2), choir (1, 2 & 4)
 Guy Warren - Drums (5)
 Damon Lyon-Shaw - Engineering (5)
 Dusty, Remi, Sandra - Choir (1-4)

Notes

Further reading 

1972 albums
Polydor Records albums
Ginger Baker albums
Atco Records albums
RSO Records albums